Robert Edward Malkmus (born July 4, 1931) is a retired American infielder and scout in Major League Baseball. He also managed in the farm systems of three MLB clubs – the Philadelphia Phillies, Montreal Expos and Baltimore Orioles.

Born and raised in Newark, New Jersey, Malkmus attended South Side High School (now Malcolm X Shabazz High School), where his small size attracted little attention from professional teams. He threw and batted right-handed, stood  (1.75 m) tall and weighed 180 pounds (82 kg). The Braves were en route to the 1957 National League pennant and World Series championship, but Malkmus could collect only two hits in 22 at bats (an .091 batting average) and was sent back to the minor leagues. That autumn, he was selected by the Washington Senators in the Rule 5 draft. Washington gave Malkmus 47 games to prove himself in 1958–59, but he batted only .186 and was outrighted to the unaffiliated Denver Bears of the American Association at the May 1959 cut-down deadline.

At the close of the 1959 campaign, Malkmus was again eligible for the Rule 5 draft, and the Philadelphia Phillies selected him. Malkmus would appear in 208 games as a utility infielder for the Phils, through the May  cutdown deadline. In his best campaign, he played in 121 games, and batted .231 in 342 at-bats with seven home runs and 31 runs batted in. Some sportswriter gave him a Most Valuable Player Award vote after the season. For his MLB career of all or parts of six seasons (1957–62), Malkmus hit .215 with eight homers and 46 RBI.

He managed in the minor leagues for nine seasons (1967–75), compiling a 508–463 record (.523) with one championship. Malkmus then scouted for the Cleveland Indians and San Diego Padres through the mid-2000s, based in Union, New Jersey. He continues to scout part-time for Cleveland as of 2017.

References

External links

Bobby Malkmus at SABR (Baseball BioProject)

1931 births
Living people
Arkansas Travelers players
Austin Senators players
Baseball players from Newark, New Jersey
Bluefield Blue-Grays players
Buffalo Bisons (minor league) players
Cleveland Indians scouts
Denver Bears players
Eugene Emeralds managers
Eugene Emeralds players
Evansville Braves players
Jacksonville Braves players
Malcolm X Shabazz High School alumni
Major League Baseball second basemen
Major League Baseball shortstops
Milwaukee Braves players
Philadelphia Phillies players
San Diego Padres (minor league) players
San Diego Padres scouts
Washington Senators (1901–1960) players
Wichita Braves players